The third season of the American science fiction television series Star Trek: Enterprise commenced airing on UPN in the United States on September 10, 2003 and concluded on May 26, 2004 after 24 episodes. Set in the 22nd century, the series follows the adventures of the first Starfleet starship Enterprise, registration NX-01, and its crew. 

Starting with the third episode of this season, producers added “Star Trek” to the name of the show, previously the series was known simply as “Enterprise.” The opening theme was also changed for a more instrumental version.

With UPN seeking to attract a wider audience for the show, this season the writers pivoted from the stand-alone episodes Star Trek had been known for, to a single, serialized storyline: the crew's mission to prevent the Earth being destroyed by a newly introduced alien species, the Xindi. Episodes focus on action-driven plots and a military assault team is stationed aboard as the crew faces more combat during missions away from Enterprise.

Plot overview
The third season embraces a heavily serialized format initially dedicated to the search for a Xindi superweapon. It focuses on the Enterprise NX-01's mission to prevent a second, more powerful Xindi attack from destroying Earth. It also explores and develops the early encounters between Humans, Vulcans and Andorians. Additionally, main characters such as Captain Archer, Commander Tucker and Sub-Commander T'Pol receive considerable development.

Cast

Main cast

Recurring cast

Episodes 

In the following table, episodes are listed by the order in which they aired.

Production
Season 3 was the first to use a single story arc for an entire season and is only one of two seasons (of every Star Trek series) not to feature a Klingon character, the other being the first season of Star Trek: Strange New Worlds. The season was cut from 26 to 24 episodes by Paramount, following some disappointing early ratings. In an attempt at boosting ratings, the series title was changed to Star Trek: Enterprise after "Extinction" (earlier episodes released later on DVD were updated to reflect this change) and the theme music was made more upbeat.

The series had been filmed in High Definition from the pilot episode, but episode 6 "Exile" was the first episode to be broadcast in HD.

Broadcast

Media information
Season three was also included in a complete set containing all four seasons of the series.

Reception

Enterprise's long-term ratings decline, which it had been suffering through its entire run, continued in Season 3, which featured both the show's last episode to be seen by more than 4 million people ("Stratagem") and the first to be seen by fewer than 3 million ("Damage").

In 2019, CBR rated Season 3 of Star Trek: Enterprise as the 7th best season of all Star Trek seasons up to that time.

Dominic Keating said he liked the original theme music but disliked the revised version used in season 3.

See also
 Xindi

References

External links

 Episode guide at StarTrek.com
 Season 3 on Memory Alpha
 Season 3 on IMDb

2003 American television seasons
2004 American television seasons
Star Trek: Enterprise
Enterprise

nl:Star Trek: Enterprise#Plot
simple:Star Trek: Enterprise